Didier Moureau (born 25 March 1930) is a French rower. He competed in the men's coxed four event at the 1952 Summer Olympics.

References

External links
 

1930 births
Possibly living people
French male rowers
Olympic rowers of France
Rowers at the 1952 Summer Olympics
Place of birth missing (living people)